Kawasaki Z250C is a motorcycle model that was produced by the Japanese manufacturer Kawasaki Heavy Industries.

History 
The Z250C was launched in 1980, a year after the Kawasaki Z250A. The original price was 3620 DM in 1981. It was the cheapest from the Kawasaki Z250 series and was built until 1982.

Equipment 
The engine is a single cylinder with a displacement of 246 cm³, overhead camshaft and electric starter. It was throttled to 17PS for the insurance-favorable class. The maximum torque is 19Nm, which can be reached at 4000 / min. The final drive worked via a chain. The front and rear drum brakes were integrated into the cast wheels. The machine reached a top speed of 126 km / h and weighed 132 kg when fully fueled. The 9.3 liter steel tank made it possible to travel on motorbikes.

Similar models 
Similar models were the Z250 A, which was first built in 1979, and the Z250LTD, which was built in 1980, and which is one of the softchoppers.

References

Z250C
Motorcycles introduced in 1980